António José Antunes Navarro, 1st Count of Lagoaça (11 July 1803 in Lagoaça – 13 July 1867 in Vila Nova de Famalicão) was a Portuguese nobleman and politician.

Life 
António José Antunes Navarro was born on 11 July 1803 in Lagoaça, Freixo de Espada à Cinta Municipality.

He served as President of the Municipal Chambers of Porto from 1858 to 1865.

After visiting Porto of King Pedro V of Portugal, he awarded the title of Viscount of Lagoaça to Antunes Navarro.

Later on, King Luís I de Portugal upgraded the title of Antunes Navarro to Count of Lagoaça by decree on 31 October 1866.

References

Sources 
Nobreza de Portugal e Brasil - vol. 2 - pages 670 to 671

Portuguese nobility
1803 births
1867 deaths
19th-century Portuguese people
Mayors of Porto
People from Freixo de Espada à Cinta